The Vision for Europe Award is an honour that has been bestowed annually since 1995 by the non-profit Edmond Israel Foundation in "recognition of outstanding achievements in taking Europe into the future."

Between 1995 and 2008, the award was presented to the recipient in a ceremony at the Edmond Israel Foundation building in Luxembourg City. Luxembourg's best-known sculptor Lucien Wercollier designed the statue presented to the recipients. The first Vision for Europe Award was given to Jacques Santer in 1995, the year he left his position as Prime Minister of Luxembourg to become President of the European Commission. The award honored his efforts to unite Europe into a single entity.

Since 2016, the Award is presented during the Prague European Summit. The statue is produced by the Czech glass manufacturer Preciosa.

Recipients

References

External links
Vision for Europe website, 

European awards